Kefalovryso ("headspring"), in Katharevousa Kefalovryson (Κεφαλόβρυσον), may refer to several places in Greece:

Kefalovryso, Argolis, a village in Argolis, part of the municipal unit Lyrkeia
Kefalovryso, Ioannina, a village in the Ioannina regional unit, part of the municipal unit Ano Pogoni
Kefalovryso, Larissa, a village in the Larissa regional unit, part of the municipality Elassona
Kefalovryso, Messenia, a village in Messenia, part of the municipal unit Aristomenis
Kefalovryso, Trikala, a village in the Trikala regional unit, part of the municipal unit Faloreia
Mega Kefalovryso, a village in the Trikala regional unit, part of the municipal unit Faloreia